David John O'Donnell (born in Nelson in 1956) is a theatre director, actor and academic based in Wellington, New Zealand. He has been a full professor at Victoria University of Wellington since 2019.

Education 
O'Donnell has a diploma in Acting from Toi Whakaari/New Zealand Drama School (1979), where his contemporaries included Lani Tupu and Simon Phillips. He is a graduate of both Victoria University of Wellington and the University of Otago, where he was awarded a Postgraduate Diploma in Arts (PGrad Dip) and an MA. His 1999 Master's thesis was titled Re-staging history: historiographic drama from New Zealand and Australia.

Work 

O'Donnell began his academic career as an assistant lecturer in Theatre Studies at Allen Hall, Otago University (1992 -1998), and has taught at Victoria University of Wellington since 1999, where he is now a full professor in the School of English, Film, Theatre, Media Studies and Art History. He has won several Excellence in Teaching Awards.

O'Donnell co-edited the 2007 book Performing Aotearoa: New Zealand Theatre and Drama in an Age of Transition with Marc Maufort. In 2017, he co-authored Floating Islanders: Pasifika Theatre in Aotearoa with Lisa Warrington. He co-authored Playmarket 40: 40 Years of Playwriting in New Zealand in 2013 with Laurie Atkinson.

He has written and published extensively on aspects of theatre and performance in New Zealand and the Pacific, including articles, book chapters, conference papers and production reviews.

He has been the editor of the Playmarket New Zealand Play Series since 2010, editing to date 17 play collections and theatre books.

He is the regional managing editor for New Zealand of The Theatre Times, a website which provides worldwide theatre news.

O'Donnell is currently a full professor in the School of English, Film, Theatre, Media and Communication, and Art History at Victoria University of Wellington, having been promoted to professor in 2019.

He has directed many plays, with a strong focus on Shakespeare and works from New Zealand, both professionally and with student performers. Shakespeare productions include several outdoor Summer Shakespeare productions for Victoria University of Wellington, including A Midsummer Night's Dream (1991), Richard III (featuring Jonathan Hendry in the title role) in 1998 and Hamlet, featuring a female 'hero'  (Stevie Hancox-Monk) in 2019. He had previously directed Hamlet in 2005 at Dunedin's Fortune Theatre, and has also directed the Henry VI trilogy for Toi Whakaari/NZ Drama School at Te Whaea in 2006. Plays by New Zealand writers he has directed include Take Me Home Mr by William Walker (2002), Te Karakia by Albert Belz (2009), Heat by Lynda Chanwai-Earle (2010), The Great Gatsby adapted by Ken Duncum Circa Theatre 2010, and Hole by Lynda Chanwai-Earle (2020), amongst a number of others. (See Awards below for more.)

As an actor, he has worked professionally for Downstage (Wellington), Centrepoint (Palmerston North) and Wow! Productions (Dunedin) amongst other companies.

Awards 

 2004: Best director for Albert Speer by David Edgar, Chapman Tripp Theatre Awards
2006: Production of the Year for Yours Truly by Albert Belz, Chapman Tripp Theatre Awards
Nominated for the following Chapman Tripp Theatre Awards: The Sojourns of Boy by Jo Randerson (best director, best production and most original production 1999); Irish Annals of Aotearoa by Simon O'Connor (best director, best production and most original production, 2001); Yours Truly by Albert Belz (best director, 2006); Charles Darwin: Collapsing Creation by Arthur Meek (best director, 2009); West End Girls by Ken Duncum (best director, 2012)
Nominated for Best Director (with Lori Leigh) for Hamlet, Wellington Theatre Awards, 2019.
 2015: Po' Okela Award from the Hawai’i State Theatre Council, for his direction of Victor Rodger’s My Name is Gary Cooper at Kumu Kahua Theater, Honolulu.
2016: Created Life Member, Australasian Association for Theatre, Drama and Performance Studies.
2018: Rob Jordan Book Prize, awarded by the Australasian Association for Theatre, Drama and Performance Studies, for Floating Islanders (joint award with Lisa Warrington).

References

External links 

 O'Donnell's inaugural professorial lecture What has theatre contributed to New Zealand culture? on YouTube

New Zealand theatre directors
Living people
1956 births
Academic staff of the Victoria University of Wellington
Victoria University of Wellington alumni
Academic staff of the University of Otago